Brandenburger is a surname. Notable people with this surname include:

Ernst Brandenburger (1689–1713, his death), Danish architect and master builder
Martin Brandenburger (1970s), Swiss slalom canoeist
Nico Brandenburger (born 1995), German footballer
Pit Brandenburger (born 1995), Luxembourgian swimmer

See also
Brandenberger (surname)
Louis V the Brandenburger (1315–1361), Bavarian duke
Brandenburger, a breed of horse
Brandenburgers, a WWII-era German special forces unit
Brandenburg, a state in northeastern Germany which surrounds Berlin